Royal Air Force Commandos were formed from units of the Royal Air Force (RAF) during the Second World War. They were formed in 1942 and served in the European and Far Eastern theatres of war before being disbanded in 1946. In 1944  RAF Commandos of the Second Tactical Air Force suffered very heavy casualties landing at Dog Green Sector of Omaha Beach to establish field operations in support of the American army.

Background
The commander of Combined Operations Louis Mountbatten on 22 January 1942 recommended that the RAF create a number of Commando units. These units, called Servicing Commandos, would accompany the Allied Armies when they invaded Europe, either to make German airfields serviceable or to make operational the new airstrips built by the Army Airfield Construction Units. Eventually 12 Servicing Commandos were formed in the United Kingdom and three in the Middle East. The force consisted of 2,400 officers and men skilled in aircraft maintenance, armaments, communications and airfield activation skills and were capable of working on all types of aircraft to keep them flying under all kinds of conditions.

These Commando Units were trained on similar lines to the British Army and Royal Marines Commandos. Each Commando unit comprised two or three officers and between 150 and 170 other ranks. They were equipped with jeeps, motorcycles and up to 15 three-ton trucks. Commando units were involved in the major seaborne landings, either going in with the initial invasion forces or giving active support in other ways to keep the aircraft flying.

Far East
As well as the 15 Servicing Commandos in Europe and the Middle East three smaller units were formed in India, and called Servicing Parties. Each Servicing Party comprised one officer and 30 men. These units were part of the RAF Support Group and supported the Chindits during Operation Thursday. After the surrender of the Japanese Forces in August 1945 they took over Japanese held airfields, assisted in the evacuation of Allied prisoners of war and undertook other peace keeping duties in Java, Thailand and French Indo China.

Operations
In the Mediterranean, Servicing Commandos took part in operations in North Africa, landings in Sicily, landings in Italy and landing in the South of France. Servicing Commando units also took part in the Normandy landings and afterwards some units were withdrawn for service in the Far East.

Units
Formed in the United Kingdom
No. 3201 Servicing Commando was formed in March 1942 from men serving in RAF Fighter Command and served in North Africa, Sicily, Italy and the South of France.
No. 3202 Servicing Commando was formed in March 1942 from men serving in RAF Fighter Command and served in North Africa, Sicily, Italy and the South of France.
No. 3203 Servicing Commando was formed in March 1942 from men serving in RAF Fighter Command and served in North Africa, Sicily, Italy and the South of France.
No. 3204 Servicing Commando was formed in February 1943, from men serving in RAF Fighter Command and served in North Africa.
No. 3205 Servicing Commando was formed in April 1943 from men serving in RAF Fighter Command and served in Normandy, India, Burma, French Indo-China, Malaya, Thailand and Java.
No. 3206 Servicing Commando was formed in April 1943 from men serving in RAF Fighter Command and served in France, Belgium, and the Netherlands.
No. 3207 Servicing Commando was formed in April 1943 from men serving in RAF Fighter Command and served in Normandy, India, Burma, French Indo-China, Malaya, Thailand and Java.
No. 3208 Servicing Commando was formed in April 1943 from men serving in RAF Fighter Command and served in  Europe.
No. 3209 Servicing Commando was formed in April 1943 from men serving in RAF Fighter Command and served in Normandy, India, Burma, French Indo-China, Malaya, Thailand and Java.
No. 3210 Servicing Commando was formed in April 1943 from men serving in RAF Fighter Command and served in Normandy, India, Burma, French Indo-China, Malaya, Thailand and Java.
No. 3225 Servicing Commando was formed in August 1942 from men serving in RAF Army Cooperation Command and served in Sicily and Italy.
No. 3226 Servicing Commando was formed in March 1942 from men serving in RAF Army Cooperation and served in Sicily and Italy.

Formed in the Middle East
No. 3230 Servicing Commando was formed in April 1942 from men serving in RAF Middle East Command and served in Sicily and Italy.
No. 3231 Servicing Commando was formed in April 1942 from men serving in RAF Middle East Command and served in Sicily and Italy.
No. 3232 Servicing Commando was formed in April 1942 from men serving in RAF Middle East Command and served in Sicily and Italy.

Formed in India
No. 1 Servicing Party was formed from men in RAF Far East Command  and served in India, Burma, Java, Thailand and French Indo China.
No. 2 Servicing Party  was formed from men in RAF Far East Command and served in India, Burma, Java, Thailand and French Indo China.
No. 3 Servicing Party  was formed from men in RAF Far East Command and served in India, Burma, Java, Thailand and French Indo China.

Battle honours
The following Battle honours were awarded to the British Commandos during the Second World War.

Adriatic
Alethangyaw
Aller
Anzio
Argenta Gap
Burma 1943–45
Crete
Dieppe
Dives Crossing
Djebel Choucha
Flushing
Greece 1944–45
Italy 1943–45
Kangaw
Landing at Porto San Venere
Landing in Sicily
Leese
Madagascar
Middle East 1941, 1942, 1944
Monte Ornito
Myebon
Normandy Landing
North Africa 1941–43
North-West Europe 1942, 1944–1945
Norway 1941
Pursuit to Messina
Rhine
St. Nazaire
Salerno
Sedjenane 1
Sicily 1943
Steamroller Farm
Syria 1941
Termoli
Vaagso
Valli di Comacchio
Westkapelle

References
Notes

Bibliography

External links 
Combined Operation site

Military units and formations of the Royal Air Force in World War II
Commandos (United Kingdom)
Air force logistics units and formations
Military units and formations established in 1940
Military units and formations disestablished in 1946
1940 establishments in the United Kingdom
1946 disestablishments in the United Kingdom